Francisco José Estévez García (born April 11, 1980) is a Spanish filmmaker born in Vilagarcía de Arousa, Pontevedra.

He was part of the first class of the School of Cinematic Arts of Galicia (Vigo, 2001). The sci-fi short film Equinoccio (Equinox) (school thesis in 35 mm). Founder of the production company Hipotálmo Films, from which in 2004 directed Metamorfosis (Metamorphosis), adaptation of the popular tale of Franz Kafka which is worth many awards and commendations. He has also made the short film El Humanoide (Humanoid) (2007) and the short experimental Titanio & Plutonio (Titanium & Plutonium) (2010).

In 2013 his more ambitious and gently filmed Idiotas (Idiots), starring a guy with a disability and his talking dog who find mysterious balloons across the city of Santiago de Compostela with a curious message: "Deflate me little by little...".

Filmography 

 Idiotas.  Director, writer, musician. (2013)
 Titanio & Plutonio en el País del Ciclograma.  Director, actor, storyboard, post, musician. (2010)
 El Humanoide.  Director, actor (contortionist), editor, soundman. (2007)
 La Canción de Fémerlin.  Assistant director, editor, musician. (2005)
 Metamorfosis.  Director, writer, editor, sound engineer, musician. (2004)
 Equinoccio. Director, screenwriter. (2003)
 Ipso Facto.  Editor, musician. (2003)
 Fandango. Director, editor. (2003)
 Ruido Blanco.  Editor, musician. (2002)
 Hipotálamo.  Director, producer, screenwriter, musician. (2002)

References

External links 
 
 Ficha AVG
 Entrevista en Franz-Kafka.info
 Blog personal MISCH-MASCH
 El Humanoide en YouTube

Spanish film directors
Film directors from Galicia (Spain)
1980 births
Living people